Peng Phan is a Cambodian film actress. She has been featured in three films by Rithy Panh: Rice People, One Evening After the War and The Burnt Theatre.

In her feature film debut, Rice People, Phan portrayed Om, the mentally unstable wife of a farmer and the mother of seven daughters, all struggling during a single rice-planting season.

In 2005's The Burnt Theatre, she portrayed herself, or a character who was an actress named Peng Phan who suffered survivor guilt and psychosomatic illness.

Filmography

References

External links
 

Cambodian film actresses
Year of birth missing (living people)
Living people
21st-century Cambodian actresses